The Brownlee Ministry was the combined Cabinet (called Executive Council of Alberta), chaired by Premier John Edward Brownlee, and Ministers that governed Alberta from part way through the 5th Alberta Legislature from November 23, 1925, to part way through the 7th Alberta Legislature on July 10, 1934.

The Executive Council (commonly known as the cabinet) was made up of members of the United Farmers of Alberta which held a majority of seats in the Legislative Assembly of Alberta. The cabinet was appointed by the Lieutenant Governor of Alberta on the advice of the Premier.

List of ministers

See also 

 Executive Council of Alberta
 List of Alberta provincial ministers

References 

 

Politics of Alberta
Executive Council of Alberta
1925 establishments in Alberta
1934 disestablishments in Alberta
Cabinets established in 1925
Cabinets disestablished in 1934